Truth in Translation is a stage play conceived and directed by Michael Lessac, with music by Hugh Masekela. It tells the story of the interpreters at South Africa's Truth and Reconciliation Commission.

The play was written in a collaboration between the interpreters who worked at the TRC, writer Paavo Tom Tammi and the company of South African actors. It premiered in Rwanda, has toured South Africa and is touring to international conflict zones such as Northern Ireland, Sierra Leone, the Balkans, Jerusalem/Ramallah, Sri Lanka, Peru, and Indonesia/Timor to tell the story of the South African experience. The project includes workshops with audiences, exhibitions (The Forgiveness Project and Jillian Edelstein's Truth and Lies) and filming of the interaction between audiences and the company, and attempts to provoke a global dialogue around notions of healing and reconciliation.

External links
 Truth in Translation
 Time magazine review of Truth in Translation (subscription needed)
 Litnet review of Truth in Translation
 theforgivenessproject.com
 The commission's home page
 The South African Truth and Reconciliation Commission Videotape Collection at Yale Law School
 Truth and Reconciliation Commission Report (PDF)
 Variety review

South African plays
Interpreting and translation in fiction
2007 plays
Plays based on actual events
Plays about apartheid
Plays set in South Africa